Thomas Elisha Winn (May 21, 1839 – June 5, 1925) was an American attorney and politician who served as a member of the United States House of Representatives for Georgia's 9th congressional district from 1891 to 1893.

Early life and education
Born near Athens, Georgia, Winn was the second child of Richard Dickinson and Charlotte Mitchell Winn. Winn attended Carrollton (Georgia) Masonic Institute, and graduated from Emory and Henry College. He studied law and was admitted to the bar in 1861 and commenced practice in Alpharetta, Georgia.

Career 
He entered the Confederate States Army as a first lieutenant in 1861.
He was promoted to captain, then major, and finally a lieutenant colonel, in the Twenty-fourth Regiment, Georgia Infantry.  He served with Lee's army (Army of Northern Virginia) until the close of the Civil War. After the War, he resumed his law practice in Milton County, Georgia and served as solicitor of the county court for two years. In 1868 Winn left the law and pursued agriculture full-time, except for civic duties.

He was a Gwinnett County school commissioner from 1876 to 1890. He was a U.S. representative from Georgia representing Gwinnett County, Georgia in the Fifty-second Congress.  Winn was elected as a Democrat. He served one term from March 4, 1891 to March 3, 1893 and did not stand for reelection.

Death 
He died in Atlanta, Georgia at the Confederate Soldiers' Home, on June 5, 1925 and was buried in the Ridge Grove Cemetery, near Greensboro, Georgia.

References

 Huff, Frederick Ware. Four Families: Winn, Thomas, Ware, Garrett of the Southern United States from 1600s to 1993. FWH: Kennesaw, GA., 1993. OCLC Number: 29382913

External links

1839 births
1925 deaths
Confederate States Army officers
Democratic Party members of the United States House of Representatives from Georgia (U.S. state)